Murat Iyigun (born March 21, 1964) is an American and Turkish scholar and author in the field of the economics of  family, economic development, political economy and cliometrics. He is a professor at the University of Colorado.

Education 
Murat Iyigun graduated with a B.S. in business administration from Hacettepe University in 1985. He then completed a MBA in Finance and economics from Boston University in 1991. He completed an A.M in Economics in 1992 from Brown University. Finally in 1995 he completed his PhD in economics from Brown. The title of his PhD thesis was Essays on Economic Mobility, Trade, Production and Extralegal Appropriation.

Career 
Upon graduating from Brown University in 1995, Murat Iyigun was hired by the Federal Reserve Board, in Washington DC, making him the first Turkish citizen hired by the US Central Bank as a staff economist. In August 2000, he was appointed assistant professor at the University of Colorado in Boulder. He became Associate professor in 2005, Professor in 2010 and appointed Calderwood Chair in 2014.

Besides his academic activities he has held several editorial positions. From 2008 to 2011 he was a board member of the European Journal of Political Economy. From 2010 to 2012 he was Associate Editor for the Journal Mathematical Population Studies. He is currently Co-editor of Journal of Demographic Economics and on the editorial board of Journal of Economics, Management and Religion.
Murat Iyigun is Research Fellow at the Institute of Labor Studies (IZA) in Bonn Germany and the Institute of Behavioral Science (IBS) at the University of Colorado in Boulder. Between 2007 and 2010, he was a visiting scholar and a Research Affiliate at the Center for International Development at Harvard University.

Publications 
Professor Iyigun published papers in leading journals such as American Economic Review Quarterly Journal of Economics, The Review of Economic Studies.

Books 
In 2015, Iyigun published a general interest book entitled War, Peace and Prosperity in the Name of God. In this book Pr. Iyigun studies the impact of monotheistic faith on socio-economic development of societies using econometric techniques. He demonstrates thanks to data that polities based on monotheistic faiths historically had larger territories and survived longer. On this basis, Pr. Iyigun argues that monotheism was a factor of sociopolitical stability domestically but a source of conflicts & territorial conquest internationally.

Music 
Murat Iyigun is also a musician, band leader and guitar player. His band, the Custom Shop - Band, plays rock, blues and R&B and performs regularly in Colorado and the Front Range.

References

External links 
 Murat Iyigun's homepage
 Homepage of the Journal of Demographic Economics
 Information at IDEAS/RePEc

Turkish emigrants to the United States
Turkish economists
Living people
1964 births